The 1981 Allan Cup was the Canadian senior ice hockey championship for the 1980–81 senior "A" season.  The event was hosted by the Thunder Bay Twins in Thunder Bay, Ontario.  The 1981 tournament marked the 73rd time that the Allan Cup has been awarded.

Teams
Grand Falls Cataracts (Atlantic)
Petrolia Squires (East)
St. Boniface Mohawks (West)
Thunder Bay Twins (Host)

Results
Round Robin
Grand Falls Cataracts 3 - St. Boniface Mohawks 2
Thunder Bay Twins 8 - Petrolia Squires 3
Thunder Bay Twins 9 - Grand Falls Cataracts 4
Petrolia Squires 6 - St. Boniface Mohawks 4
Thunder Bay Twins 5 - St. Boniface Mohawks 4 (OT)
Petrolia Squires 6 - Grand Falls Cataracts 3
Semi-final
St. Boniface Mohawks 4 - Thunder Bay Twins 3
Petrolia Squires 6 - Grand Falls Cataracts 3
Final
Petrolia Squires 5 - St. Boniface Mohawks 1

External links
Allan Cup archives 
Allan Cup website

Allan Cup